The 1933 Idaho Vandals football team represented the University of Idaho in the 1933 college football season. The Vandals were led by fifth-year head coach Leo Calland, and were members of the Pacific Coast Conference. Home games were played on campus in Moscow at MacLean Field, with none in Boise this year.

Idaho compiled a  overall record and lost all but one of its five games in the PCC.

In the Battle of the Palouse with neighbor Washington State, the Vandals suffered a sixth straight loss, falling  on homecoming in Moscow on  Idaho's most recent win in the series was eight years earlier in 1925 and the next was 21 years away in 1954.

Schedule

 The Little Brown Stein trophy for the Montana game debuted five years later in 1938
 One game was played on Friday (at Oregon in Eugene at night)and one was played on Thursday (at Gonzaga in Spokane on Thanksgiving)

All-conference
No Vandals were named to the All-Coast team; quarterback Willis Smith was a third team selection.

References

External links
Gem of the Mountains: 1934 University of Idaho yearbook – 1933 football season
Go Mighty Vandals – 1933 football season
Idaho Argonaut – student newspaper – 1933 editions

Idaho
Idaho Vandals football seasons
Idaho Vandals football